Chhakchhuak Lallawmzuala (born 8 April 1990 in Mizoram) is an Indian footballer who plays as a defender for Aizawl in the I-League.

Career statistics

Club

References

External links 
 Profile at Goal.com

1990 births
Living people
I-League players
Association football defenders
Indian footballers
Shillong Lajong FC players
Footballers from Mizoram
Royal Wahingdoh FC players
Aizawl FC players